James Lee Lindsey Jr. (May 1, 1980 – January 13, 2010), known professionally as Jay Reatard, was an American musician from Memphis, Tennessee. He was signed to Matador Records. He released recordings as a solo artist and as a member of the Reatards and Lost Sounds.

Biography

Early life
Lindsey was born in Lilbourn, Missouri, in 1980. He and his family moved to Memphis when he was 8 years old, since his father struggled to find employment in his hometown. His recording career began at age 15, when a homemade demo tape he sent to Goner Records caught the ear of former Oblivian and Goner Records' owner Eric Friedl. Lindsey heard Friedl and the Oblivians bandmates earlier that year when they returned home to Memphis as the opening act for Rocket from the Crypt. Lindsey became enamored of their sloppy, lo-fi music and set forth creating his own brand of heavily distorted garage rock. Friedl was impressed by Lindsey's demos and signed him to his label, later commenting, "I loved the racket so we did the record, and I've been a fan of everything he's done since. He's a pretty amazing kid."

Lindsey named his first project the Reatards, which at the time included only himself as a member, and adopted an Oblivians-influenced surname, calling himself Jay Reatard. The Reatards' first release on Goner was the 7-inch EP Get Real Stupid, featuring Lindsey on guitar, vocals, and beating on a bucket to provide a percussive rhythm. Around this time Greg Cartwright, a member of The Oblivians, briefly played drums for Lindsey. He also played shows and recorded with Lindsey on Lindsey's first (self-released) cassette, Fuck Elvis, Here's The Reatards (No-Fi Records), with recording assistance from Jack Yarber, another Oblivian.

For Lindsey's second vinyl release he recruited a backing band consisting of bassist Steve Albundy and drummer Elvis Wong. The Reatards' first LP as a trio was 1998's Teenage Hate on Goner Records. It was followed by a second LP, Grown Up Fucked Up on eMpTy Records (US), and a number of singles. The Reatards' first European tour came in 1998, when Lindsey was 18.

2000s
In 2001, Lindsey began recording music with Alicja Trout and Rich Crook as the Lost Sounds, a side project which would ultimately usurp the Reatards as Lindsey's primary musical venture. With alternating male and female vocals, as well as prominently-employed synthesizers, the Lost Sounds were a departure from the guitar-driven garage rock of the Reatards, and had a sound more akin to the early punk rock of The Screamers, a synthesizer-heavy punk band that Lindsey had been exposed to by Elvis Wong shortly after the recording of the Reatards' first LP. Lindsey once claimed that his time in the Lost Sounds "was and is more fun than anything else I have ever done." Yet despite Lindsey's enthusiasm for the band, the Lost Sounds bitterly broke up in 2005.

Lindsey was a prolific songwriter, often acting as a member and contributing compositions to two or more bands concurrently. One of Lindsey's first side projects was the Bad Times, a one-off band which included Eric Friedl and King Louie Bankston. The band recorded an album's worth of material after only one practice session in 1998, releasing a self-titled LP in 2001. After one live performance, the band disbanded, the members returning to their respective solo commitments.

While Lindsey was still a member of both the Reatards and the Lost Sounds, he joined a side project called the Final Solutions. Lindsey's association with the future members of the Final Solutions began while he was still a teenager. Fighting problems at home, Lindsey opted to take up residence with members of a local band called the Jackmonkeys. While he was rooming with the band, he was conscripted to play drums for them at a battle of the bands which was being held at the school's cafeteria. With Lindsey on drums, the band, under the moniker "the High and Mightys," performed a set of Oblivians covers, earning instant hate in the competition (FS bassist Tommy Trouble's band, the Squirrels earned third place). After separating for a number of years, the group reformed under the name the Final Solutions and began touring and releasing albums.

In 2004, Lindsey, together with his ex-girlfriend, Alix Brown of Atlanta rock band the Lids, formed Shattered Records, an independent record label that released mainly limited edition vinyl. Shattered Records released records for a number of lo-fi punk and rock bands, including: Kajun SS, Jack Oblivian, Tokyo Electron, The Reatards, Final Solutions, Terror Visions, Angry Angles, Carbonas, Rat Traps, Digital Leather, and the Knaughty Knights.

In 2007, Lindsey put Shattered Records on hold while he promoted his solo records. Then in 2009, Lindsey revived the label with the "Shattered Record Club" and the announcement of his final solo album, Watch Me Fall.

Out of this partnership came another musical endeavor for Lindsey, the Angry Angles. Together with Brown, and alternating between drummers Paul Artigues from Die Rotzz and Ryan Rousseau ('Elvis Wong') from Tokyo Electron, the band began touring the U.S. in the Fall of 2006. Before the band had even released its second single, Lindsey and Brown began a short European tour. The Angry Angles disbanded after releasing a number of vinyl singles.

By 2005, both the Reatards and the Lost Sounds had broken up, and Lindsey focused his attention on a handful of side projects, working with and releasing material as Terror Visions and Destruction Unit. Though after he began focusing on his solo career in 2006, Lindsey said he has no desire to reform his previous bands. "I'd just feel like I was going backwards if I worked on anything else," Lindsey said.

2006 saw the release of Blood Visions (In the Red), Lindsey's first solo album under the moniker Jay Reatard. After a lengthy tour supporting his solo album, in 2008, he signed a multi-album, exclusive deal with the New York-based indie label Matador Records. Lindsey chose Matador because he felt they were "the only ones keeping any of the promises they'd made along the way." A number of major labels like Universal Records, Columbia Records, and Vice Records along with independent Fat Possum wanted to meet with him in the hopes of signing him.  He released six limited, 7-inch singles throughout 2008 with Matador. Soon after the release of the first single and write-ups in NME, Spin Magazine, and Rolling Stone, Lindsey began playing larger shows and various music festivals all over the world.

"My Shadow" was featured in MLB 2K8.

In October 2008, Lindsey's Matador Singles '08 LP compiled all six of the 2008 singles on one LP/CD. Lindsey again hit the road to support the album with a second, extensive 2008 tour.
Lindsey's later records sound drastically different from his early punk records. He said writers often misinterpret his newer sound. "I just think it's noisy pop music," Lindsey said.

Lindsey's final album, Watch Me Fall (his first proper studio album with Matador), was released in August 2009. He described this collection of songs as more melodic and twee-inspired. In a 2009 interview, Lindsey said "these new batch of songs feature organ, some mandolins, a cello, a lot more back-ups and harmonies." He noted that he'd "become a little bit more about the melodies... I think I stripped away a layer of the fuzz; I might have been challenging people before to find them and this time I might be making them a little bit more obvious."

While he claimed Watch Me Fall was more mellow than his previous works, Lindsey said his live show would remain energetic. "I just want it to be like an assault live, and softer on records," he said.
In an August 2009 interview with Turn it Down Interviews, Lindsey said the album's lyrics are centered around his growing fear of death and the betrayal of close friends.

After the release of Watch Me Fall, Lindsey contributed to a tribute album for New Zealand rock and roll musician Chris Knox, with whom he was to collaborate until Knox suffered a stroke in June 2009. He recorded a cover of the Toy Love song, "Pull Down the Shades". All proceeds from the album will go towards Knox's recovery.

Lindsey's band (that consisted of members of another Memphis band, The Barbaras) quit playing with Lindsey around October 5, 2009, although specific details were not released. He finished the dates he had previously booked with replacement players, the bassist and drummer of the Danish band Cola Freaks (da), with whom he had previously toured.

Lindsey appeared on a Nirvana 'In Utero' tribute limited release record on April 19, 2014, during Record Store Day.  Lindsey played "Frances Farmer Will Have Her Revenge on Seattle" and was one of the last recordings before his death.

Death
Lindsey was found dead in his home in the Cooper-Young neighborhood of Midtown, Memphis, around 3:30 a.m. on Wednesday, January 13, 2010, at the age of 29. He was found in his bed by a roommate. A statement was posted on the website of Goner Records that Lindsey had died in his sleep. Friends of Lindsey stated that he had recently complained of flu-like symptoms. An autopsy was performed by the Shelby County medical examiner. Memphis's Commercial Appeal  reported on February 3 that Lindsey had died of "cocaine toxicity, and that alcohol was a contributing factor in his death."

MyFox Memphis reported that police had begun a homicide investigation and were actively looking for a possible suspect. The report was later removed from the TV station's website.

A memorial was held for Lindsey on Saturday, January 16 in Memphis at Memorial Park Funeral Home, attended by family and friends. Musician and friend Eric Friedl, founder of Goner Records, and bandmate Stephen Pope eulogized Lindsey. One of Lindsey's trademark white Gibson Flying V guitars hung behind his coffin at the funeral home; he was buried with the guitar the next day at Memorial Park Cemetery.

Reatard's final single, recorded just days before he died, "You Get No Love/I Am Growing", was released posthumously in March 2011. In a 2009 interview, he made references to several unreleased songs recorded for his final album, Watch Me Fall. Additionally, several of his bands released demos, unreleased songs, and alternate versions recorded with him in the years after his death.

A feature-length documentary film titled Better Than Something: Jay Reatard was released in March 2012.  The film, made by New York City filmmakers Alex Hammond and Ian Markiewicz, is an elaboration of their short film Waiting For Something.  The film predominantly features footage shot with Lindsey in April 2009, along with never before seen concert and home video footage, and cameos from many of Lindsey's family members and colleagues. Better Than Something: Jay Reatard premiered at the Nashville Film Festival in Nashville, Tennessee in April 2011.

In January 2012, Lindsey's manager Adam Shore collaborated with the Yellow Bird Project to create a memorial T-shirt. The design is based on a photograph of Lindsey's Gibson Flying V, with the initials 'JR' added to the headstock. All profits from the sale of this T-shirt have benefited the St. Judes Research Hospital, a charity designated by Lindsey's father.

In 2012, Memphis band The Barbaras (whose members Billy Hayes and Stephen Pope were members of Jay's live band), released their only album 2006-2008, which Reatard helped produce.

In 2014, the French label Teenage Hate Records released a "French Tribute to Jay Reatard" with 14 French bands. Cheveu, Magnetix, Kap Bambino, Bikini Machine & Didier Wampas, The Liminanas and few more release a cover for the records.

In 2020, the label Retard Records released "JAY REATARD - A Canadian Tribute" with 11 artists.

Discography

Blood Visions LP/CD (2006; In the Red)
Watch Me Fall LP/CD (2009; Matador)

Tributes
 PUP recorded a cover of the song "My Shadow" and an accompanying live music video in 2014.
 Roll the Tanks recorded "Goodnight Jimmy Lee", a tribute song, featured on the 2014 album Broke Til Midnight.
 Deerhunter frontman Bradford Cox recorded "He Would Have Laughed", a song about Lindsey, featured on the 2010 album Halcyon Digest.
 TV Freaks recorded "Song For Jay" a song about Lindsey, featured on the 2015 album Bad Luck Charms.
 King Khan wrote "So Wild" as a tribute to his friend, and recorded it with King Khan and the Shrines on the 2013 album Idle No More.
 Hunx and his Punx recorded "Say Goodbye Before You Leave" about Reatard, featured on the 2012 album Hairdresser Blues.
Sean Bonnette has covered his work, particularly “Fading All Away”. Though he has played it live, it has also appeared on the AJJ album Rompilation 2.0: The Digitizing, as well as performed by Sean during his Coronavirus livestream series in 2020.

References

External links

Jay Reatard at Matador Records

1980 births
2010 deaths
20th-century American singers
21st-century American singers
Alcohol-related deaths in Tennessee
American indie rock musicians
American punk rock musicians
Arts & Crafts Productions artists
Burials in Tennessee
Cocaine-related deaths in Tennessee
Fat Possum Records artists
Garage punk musicians
Singers from Tennessee
People from Memphis, Tennessee
American punk rock guitarists
American rock guitarists
American punk rock singers
American male guitarists
20th-century American male singers
21st-century American male singers
In the Red artists
Burials at Memorial Park Cemetery (Memphis, Tennessee)